The 1998 Purdue Boilermakers football team represented Purdue University during the 1998 NCAA Division I-A football season. They played their home games at Ross–Ade Stadium in West Lafayette, Indiana and were members of the Big Ten Conference.

Schedule

Roster

Game summaries

Iowa

Indiana

Kansas State (Alamo Bowl)

References

Purdue
Purdue Boilermakers football seasons
Alamo Bowl champion seasons
Purdue Boilermakers football